Kpish means "thunder" in the Páez language of indigenous Colombians that live in the Paez region of Cauca.

In the cosmology of these indigenous people, Kpish is an omnipresent deity held in high regard.  The deity is manifested in many diverse ways, both eminent and circumstantial.

See also
 Paez people
 Páez, Cauca

Related links
Article about the indigenous culture

South American deities